Jericho is a town in Chittenden County, Vermont, United States. As of the 2020 census, the population was 5,104. The town was named after the ancient city of Jericho.

History 
Ira Allen and Remember Baker began surveying the town of Jericho in 1773 for the Onion River Land Company. The Browns were the first European family to settle in Jericho, in 1774, building a cabin near the Browns River. 

In 1776, a detachment of the Continental Army was sent to garrison a blockhouse in Jericho along the Onion (Winooski) River. The garrison soon retreated back to Fort Ticonderoga within weeks of their arrival due to fears of British advance south from Canada. The officers involved, including Matthew Lyon, were tried and convicted by court martial for cowardice and disobeying orders to maintain the post. The location of the Jericho blockhouse is believed to have been along River Road near the intersection with Skunk Hollow.

In 1780 the Brown family was taken captive by a war party of British-allied Mohawks returning to Canada following the Royalton Raid.

Geography

The town of Jericho has a connection with the neighboring town of Underhill. The area has four distinct village areas. The historic Old Red Mill, home of the Jericho Historical Society, stands in Jericho village (also known as Jericho Corners) on Route 15 in the northwest part of the town, an area that extends from the Browns River crossing near Joe's Snack Bar eastward to the post office and the Jericho Elementary School. Jericho Corners is the location of the Galusha House, home of Truman Galusha, a brick Federal-style house built in 1790 and like Jericho's Old Red Mill, listed on the National Register of Historic Places.

Jericho's second village, Jericho Center, on Browns Trace, is home to several historic buildings, churches, and Jericho Center Country Store, Vermont's oldest continuously running general store. The Jericho Center Village has a village green, or "Common", a typical park-like center of a Vermont village, surrounded by historic buildings.

Half of the Underhill Flats area on Route 15 is within Jericho. This area features the multi-use Mills Riverside Park and two general stores (Jolley & Jacob's).

Underhill Center in the town of Underhill has one general store, as well as St. Thomas Catholic Church, a small postal office, and access to Underhill State Park.

Jericho is home to the Chittenden East Wolverines of the Northern Vermont Youth Football League, Cub Scout Pack 620, and one of Vermont's oldest and largest Boy Scout troops, Troop 627.

The two towns share the Underhill-Jericho Fire Department.

Schools
Schools fall under the umbrella of the Mount Mansfield Modified Union School District. Local school includes Jericho Elementary School serving from kindergarten through fourth grade. Browns River Middle School teaches grades five through eight. There is one high school in Jericho—Mount Mansfield Union High School—which serves students from Jericho, Underhill, Richmond, Huntington, Bolton, Jonesville, and Westford.

Students from Mount Mansfield Union High School are allowed to apply to a vocational school for their junior and senior years. They can apply to either The Center for Technology, Essex (CTE), or the Burlington Technical Center (BTC). CTE is located in Essex Junction and is part of the larger Essex High School (EHS).

MMU has 814 students enrolled as of 2018, making it the eighth most enrolled school in Vermont.

On November 4, 2014, the communities of Bolton, Jericho, Richmond, Underhill ID and Underhill Town voted to form the Mount Mansfield Modified Union School District also known as the MMMUSD. On June 6, 2019, MMUUSD voted to also include the town of Huntington. This school district serves and governs the current town school districts of Bolton (Smilie Memorial School), Huntington (Brewster Pierce Memorial Elementary), Jericho (Jericho Elementary), Richmond (Richmond Elementary), and Underhill (Underhill Central School), Mt Mansfield Union School District (Browns River Middle, Camels Hump Middle and Mt. Mansfield Union High Schools) in grades Pre-K through 12.

Demographics

As of the census of 2000, there were 5,015 people, 1,751 households, and 1,402 families residing in the town. The population density was 141.7 people per square mile (54.7/km2). There were 1,774 housing units at an average density of 50.1 per square mile (19.4/km2). The racial makeup of the town was 97.45% White, 0.68% Black or African American, 0.14% Native American, 0.56% Asian, 0.08% Pacific Islander, 0.30% from other races, and 0.80% from two or more races. Hispanic or Latino of any race were 1.12% of the population.

There were 1,751 households, out of which 45.9% had children under the age of 18 living with them, 70.4% were married couples living together, 7.1% had a female householder with no husband present, and 19.9% were non-families. 14.3% of all households were made up of individuals, and 4.3% had someone living alone who was 65 years of age or older. The average household size was 2.86 and the average family size was 3.19.

In the town, the population was spread out, with 30.9% under the age of 18, 4.6% from 18 to 24, 31.7% from 25 to 44, 26.4% from 45 to 64, and 6.4% who were 65 years of age or older. The median age was 37 years. For every 100 females, there were 98.1 males. For every 100 females age 18 and over, there were 92.6 males.

The median income for a household in the town was $65,375, and the median income for a family was $72,500. Males had a median income of $49,375 versus $30,488 for females. The per capita income for the town was $24,941. About 3.6% of families and 4.6% of the population were below the poverty line, including 6.2% of those under age 18 and 3.7% of those age 65 or over.

Notable people
Wilson "Snowflake" Bentley (1865–1931), farmer who photographed over five thousand snow crystals 
Lea Davison, Olympic athlete
William B. Gray, United States attorney for Vermont
Heman Lowry, U.S. marshal for Vermont
Anson Rood (1827–1898), Wisconsin State assemblyman and businessman

In popular culture
A fictitious version of Jericho is the setting of the 2022 Netflix series Wednesday.

References

External links
 
 Town of Jericho official website

 
Towns in Vermont
Burlington, Vermont metropolitan area
Towns in Chittenden County, Vermont
1763 establishments in the Thirteen Colonies
Populated places established in 1763